Aleson Shipping Lines, Inc. is a shipping company based in Zamboanga, Philippines. Their services include routes to Sandakan, Malaysia and over Dapitan to Dumaguete. They also ship cargo from Zamboanga City to Manila with twelve of their container carriers.

History
The company was founded on October 1, 1976, and its first vessel MV Estrella del Mar transported passengers and cargo, mainly rice, to the neighboring islands. In 1980, the company acquired its first cargo vessel, thus the debut of MV Aleson.

The company expanded in the 1980s with more cargo ships, along with voyages to Singapore for trade and commerce purposes.

During the 1990s the company concentrated on the passenger and roll-on/roll-off ferry sector. Additional vessels were added to carry more passengers and travel on more routes. In 1994, a new route between Zamboanga Port and Sandakan Port, Malaysia was opened in response to the development of BIMP-EAGA routes. Aleson's MV Danica Joy was one of the first vessels that sailed on this route.

In 1999, the company expanded into containerizing cargo, with the addition of new container carriers. The first fast craft of the corporation was bought on 2004 and was named MV Seajet.

At present, Aleson operates a fleet of 36 vessels and is the largest shipping operator in Western Mindanao.

Ports of call 
Aleson Shipping Lines Inc. main port of call is Zamboanga City, but some of their ships are actively in service for Tubigon, Bohol, Cebu, Manila, Dapitan, Dumaguete, Bongao, Tawi-Tawi, Isabela City, Basilan, Lamitan City, Basilan, and Bongao, Tawi-Tawi

Routes 
 Zamboanga City - Isabela, Basilan
 Zamboanga City - Lamitan, Basilan
 Zamboanga City - Jolo, Sulu
 Zamboanga City - Bongao, Tawi-Tawi
 Zamboanga City - Sandakan, Malaysia
 Dapitan - Dumaguete, Negros Oriental
 Cebu City - Tubigon, Bohol
 Manila - Bacolod - Zamboanga City*
*for cargoes only

Fleet 

Current (as of March 2017)

Former
 MV Danica Joy
 MV Lady Mary Joy 2
 MV Estrella Del Mar
 MV Aleson

Notable incidents 
On February 18, 2016, MV Lady Mary Joy 1 with 308 passengers and 38 crew members grounded off Pampat Point at Bongao island, Philippines. The ship was en route from Zamboanga City to Bongao, but due to human mistake and strong winds grounded in a rocky shallow. The ship hardly stuck and was unable to refloat by own power, requesting assistance from the local authorities. At the scene of the accident were dispatched several rescue boats, which evacuated all the passengers to the shore. According to preliminary information there are no injured people from the crew and guests on board. The authorities started investigation for the root cause of the accident.

On September 21, 2016, MV Danica Joy arrived at 4 pm from Sandakan. But by around 9:30 pm she went off-balance while moored at the Zamboanga International Seaport. The ship was carrying 799 passengers, including of which 11 Malaysians and one Australian, and 603 deportees. All passengers were unloaded earlier on, resulting to no casualties.

See also 
 List of shipping companies in the Philippines
 2GO Travel
 Weesam Express
 Ever Shipping Lines Inc.
 Cokaliong Shipping Lines
 Montenegro Shipping Lines

References

External links 
 

Shipping companies of the Philippines
Transportation in Mindanao
Companies based in Zamboanga City